During the 2003–04 Italian football season, A.S. Bari competed in the Serie B.

Season summary
Bari were expected to make a bid for an immediate return to the Serie A, but struggled all season. Manager Marco Tardelli was sacked and replaced by Giuseppe Pillon, who led the team to a secure but disappointing 21st place finish.

Kit
A.S. Bari's kit was manufactured by Italian sports retailer Lotto and sponsored by Pasta Ambra.

Squad

Serie B

S.S.C. Bari seasons
Bari